Komal Rishabh Asavari, often simply called Asavari, is a raga in Hindustani classical music. As its name suggests, it differs from the raga Shuddh Rishabh Asavari by using a komal ("flat") re while Asavari uses a shuddha (natural) re. It is believed that Komal Rishabh Asavari was the original form of Asavari.

Theory
Arohana: 

Avarohana: 

Vadi: 

Samavadi:

Notes

References

Sources
 
 

Hindustani ragas